John Crabbie also known as 'Jack' was a Scottish rugby union player.

Rugby Union career

Amateur career

He played for Edinburgh Academicals. While at studying at Oxford he played for Oxford University.

Provincial career

Crabbie played for the Anglo-Scots in 1898.

International career

Military career

Crabbie served in the First World War for 3rd (Perthshire) Battalion, Royal Highlanders (Black Watch). He started as a Second Lieutenant but was promoted to Lieutenant (while Temporary Captain) on 12 August 1915.

Outside of rugby

Crabbie became an Advocate. He also became a Freemason in Lodge Blairhoyle. He became the Provincial Grand Master of Perthshire West, a post which he held for twenty years.

Family

He was the brother of George Crabbie who was also capped for Scotland.

References

Sources

 Bath, Richard (ed.) The Scotland Rugby Miscellany (Vision Sports Publishing Ltd, 2007 )

1879 births
1937 deaths
Scottish rugby union players
Scotland international rugby union players
Edinburgh Academicals rugby union players
Rugby union players from Edinburgh
Scottish Exiles (rugby union) players
Oxford University RFC players
Rugby union wings